Sargasso Sea is an album by guitarists John Abercrombie and Ralph Towner that was released by ECM in 1976.

Reception 
The Allmusic review by Michael G. Nastos gave the album 3 stars, stating, "An uneven recording for many listeners and critics, Sargasso Sea deserves a second chance, not as an absolutely flawed, imperfect, or unbalanced effort. Like a tale of two cities, it stands as a unique project, perhaps deserving a more refined approach."  The Penguin Guide to Jazz gave the album 3 stars, calling it, "a winsome, diffident affair on which only the timbral variation of Towner's 12-string and piano figures sustains interest... it's less than representative of Abercrombie's real strengths." The Rolling Stone Jazz Record Guide said, "The alternately pensive and vibrant electric/acoustic interplay between these two master guitarists makes this a classic album of guitar duets."

Track listing

Personnel 
 John Abercrombie – electric guitar, acoustic guitar
 Ralph Towner – twelve-string guitar, classical guitar, piano

References 

ECM Records albums
Ralph Towner albums
John Abercrombie (guitarist) albums
1976 albums
Albums produced by Manfred Eicher